Eleni Daniilidou was the defending champion and successfully defended her title, by defeating Ashley Harkleroad 6–3, 6–2 in the final.

Seeds

Draw

Finals

Top half

Bottom half

Qualifying

Seeds

Qualifiers

Qualifying draw

First qualifier

Second qualifier

Third qualifier

Fourth qualifier

References
 Official results archive (ITF)
 Official results archive (WTA)

WTA Auckland Open